This is a list of Catholic clergy throughout history who have made contributions to science. These churchmen-scientists include Nicolaus Copernicus, Gregor Mendel, Georges Lemaître, Albertus Magnus, Roger Bacon, Pierre Gassendi, Roger Joseph Boscovich, Marin Mersenne, Bernard Bolzano, Francesco Maria Grimaldi, Nicole Oresme, Jean Buridan, Robert Grosseteste, Christopher Clavius, Nicolas Steno, Athanasius Kircher, Giovanni Battista Riccioli, William of Ockham, and others listed below. The Catholic Church has also produced many lay scientists and mathematicians.

The Jesuits in particular have made numerous significant contributions to the development of science. For example, the Jesuits have dedicated significant study to earthquakes, and seismology has been described as "the Jesuit science." The Jesuits have been described as "the single most important contributor to experimental physics in the seventeenth century." According to Jonathan Wright in his book God's Soldiers, by the eighteenth century the Jesuits had "contributed to the development of pendulum clocks, pantographs, barometers, reflecting telescopes and microscopes, to scientific fields as various as magnetism, optics and electricity. They observed, in some cases before anyone else, the colored bands on Jupiter's surface, the Andromeda nebula and Saturn's rings. They theorized about the circulation of the blood (independently of Harvey), the theoretical possibility of flight, the way the moon affected the tides, and the wave-like nature of light."

Because there is a List of lay Catholic scientists, this list does not include lay members of religious orders, such as (non-priest) monks and nuns, brothers and sisters, or anyone in 'minor orders' at such times that those were not considered clergy.

The clergy-scientists

A

José de Acosta (1539–1600) – Jesuit missionary and naturalist who wrote one of the first detailed and realistic descriptions of the new world
François d'Aguilon (1567–1617) – Belgian Jesuit mathematician, architect, and physicist, who worked on optics
Lorenzo Albacete (1941–2014) – priest, physicist, and theologian
Albert of Castile (c. 1460 – 1522) – Dominican priest and historian
Albert of Saxony (philosopher) (c. 1320 – 1390) – German bishop known for his contributions to logic and physics; with Buridan he helped develop the theory that was a precursor to the modern theory of inertia
Albertus Magnus (c. 1206 – 1280) – Dominican friar and Bishop of Regensburg who has been described as "one of the most famous precursors of modern science in the High Middle Ages." Patron saint of natural sciences; Works in physics, logic, metaphysics, biology, and psychology.
Giulio Alenio (1582–1649) – Jesuit theologian, astronomer and mathematician; was sent to the Far East as a missionary and adopted a Chinese name and customs; wrote 25 books, including a cosmography and a Life of Jesus in Chinese.
José María Algué (1856–1930) – priest and meteorologist who invented the barocyclonometer
José Antonio de Alzate y Ramírez (1737–1799) – priest, scientist, historian, cartographer, and meteorologist who wrote more than thirty treatises on a variety of scientific subjects
Bartholomeus Amicus (1562–1649) – Jesuit who wrote about include Aristotelian philosophy, mathematics, astronomy, and the concept of vacuum and its relationship with God
Stefano degli Angeli (1623–1697) – Jesuate (not to be confused with Jesuit), philosopher and mathematician, known for his work on the precursors of infinitesimal calculus
Pierre Ango (1640–1694) – Jesuit scientist who published a book on optics
Francesco Castracane degli Antelminelli (1817–1899) – priest and botanist who was one of the first to introduce microphotography into the study of biology
Giovanni Antonelli (1818–1872) – priest and astronomer who served as director of the Ximenian Observatory of Florence
Nicolò Arrighetti (1709–1767) – Jesuit who wrote treatises on light, heat, and electricity
Mariano Artigas (1938–2006) – Spanish physicist, philosopher and theologian
Giuseppe Asclepi (1706–1776) – Jesuit astronomer and physician who served as director of the Collegio Romano observatory; the lunar crater Asclepi is named after him
Nicanor Austriaco – Dominican microbiologist, associate professor of biology and professor of theology at Providence College as well as chief researcher at the Austriaco Laboratory

B
Roger Bacon (c. 1214 – 1294) – Franciscan friar who made significant contributions to mathematics and optics and has been described as a forerunner of modern scientific method
Bernardino Baldi (1533–1617) – abbot, mathematician, and writer
Eugenio Barsanti (1821–1864) – Piarist, possible inventor of the internal combustion engine
Daniello Bartoli (1608–1685) – Bartoli and fellow Jesuit astronomer Niccolò Zucchi are credited as probably having been the first to see the equatorial belts on the planet Jupiter
Joseph Bayma (1816–1892) – Jesuit known for work in stereochemistry and mathematics
Giovanni Battista Beccaria (1716–1781) – Piarist, physicist, teacher of Joseph-Louis Lagrange, Luigi Galvani and Alessandro Volta, correspondent of Benjamin Franklin
Giacopo Belgrado (1704–1789) – Jesuit professor of mathematics and physics and court mathematician who did experimental work in electricity
Michel Benoist (1715–1774) – missionary to China and scientist
Mario Bettinus (1582–1657) – Jesuit philosopher, mathematician and astronomer; lunar crater Bettinus named after him
Giuseppe Biancani (1566–1624) – Jesuit astronomer, mathematician, and selenographer, after whom the crater Blancanus on the Moon is named
Jacques de Billy (1602–1679) – Jesuit who has produced a number of results in number theory which have been named after him; published several astronomical tables; the crater Billy on the Moon is named after him
Paolo Boccone (1633–1704) – Cistercian botanist who contributed to the fields of medicine and toxicology
Bernard Bolzano (1781–1848) – priest, mathematician, and logician whose other interests included metaphysics, ideas, sensation, and truth
Anselmus de Boodt (1550–1632) – canon who was one of the founders of mineralogy
Theodoric Borgognoni (1205–1298) – Dominican friar, Bishop of Cervia, and medieval Surgeon who made important contributions to antiseptic practice and anaesthetics
Thomas Borgmeier (1892–1975) – German-born priest and entomologist who worked in Brazil
Christopher Borrus (1583–1632) – Jesuit mathematician and astronomy who made observations on the magnetic variation of the compass
Roger Joseph Boscovich (1711–1787) – Croatian Jesuit polymath known for his contributions to modern atomic theory and astronomy and for devising perhaps the first geometric procedure for determining the equator of a rotating planet from three observations of a surface feature and for computing the orbit of a planet from three observations of its position
Joachim Bouvet (1656–1730) – Jesuit sinologist and cartographer who did his work in China
Michał Boym (c. 1612 – 1659) – Jesuit who was one of the first westerners to travel within the Chinese mainland, and the author of numerous works on Asian fauna, flora and geography
Thomas Bradwardine (c. 1290 – 1349) – Archbishop of Canterbury and mathematician who helped develop the mean speed theorem; one of the Oxford Calculators
Martin Stanislaus Brennan (1845–1927) – priest and astronomer who wrote several books about science
Henri Breuil (1877–1961) – priest, archaeologist, anthropologist, ethnologist and geologist
Jan Brożek (1585–1652) – Polish canon, polymath, mathematician, astronomer, and physician; the most prominent Polish mathematician of the 17th century
Pádraig de Brún (1889–1960) – Irish priest, mathematician, poet, and classical scholar; served as Professor of Mathematics at St. Patrick's College, Maynooth, President of University College Galway, and Chairman of the Council of the Dublin Institute for Advanced Studies 
Louis-Ovide Brunet (1826–1876) – priest, one of the founding fathers of Canadian botany
Ismaël Bullialdus (1605–1694) – priest, astronomer, and member of the Royal Society; the Bullialdus crater is named in his honor
Jean Buridan (c. 1300 – after 1358) – priest who formulated early ideas of momentum and inertial motion and sowed the seeds of the Copernican revolution in Europe
Roberto Busa (1913–2011) – Jesuit, wrote a lemmatization of the complete works of St. Thomas Aquinas (Index Thomisticus) which was later digitalized by IBM

C
Niccolò Cabeo (1586–1650) – Jesuit mathematician; the crater Cabeus is named in his honor
Nicholas Callan (1799–1846) – priest and Irish scientist best known for his work on the induction coil  
Luca de Samuele Cagnazzi (1764–1852) – archdeacon, mathematician, political economist and inventor of the tonograph
John Cantius (1390–1473) – priest and Buridanist mathematical physicist who further developed the theory of impetus  
Jean Baptiste Carnoy (1836–1899) – priest, has been called the founder of the science of cytology
Giovanni di Casali (died c. 1375) – Franciscan friar who provided a graphical analysis of the motion of accelerated bodies
Paolo Casati (1617–1707) – Jesuit mathematician who wrote on astronomy, meteorology, and vacuums; the crater Casatus on the Moon is named after him; published Terra machinis mota (1658), a dialogue between Galileo, Paul Guldin and father Marin Mersenne on cosmology, geography, astronomy and geodesy, giving a positive image of Galileo 25 years after his conviction.
Laurent Cassegrain (1629–1693) – priest who was the probable namesake of the Cassegrain telescope; the crater Cassegrain on the Moon is named after him
Louis Bertrand Castel (1688–1757) – French Jesuit physicist who worked on gravity and optics in a Cartesian context
Benedetto Castelli (1578–1643) – Benedictine mathematician; long-time friend and supporter of Galileo Galilei, who was his teacher; wrote an important work on fluids in motion
Bonaventura Cavalieri (1598–1647) – Jesuate (not to be confused with Jesuit) known for his work on the problems of optics and motion, work on the precursors of infinitesimal calculus, and the introduction of logarithms to Italy; his principle in geometry partially anticipated integral calculus; the lunar crater Cavalerius is named in his honor
Antonio José Cavanilles (1745–1804) – priest and leading Spanish taxonomic botanist of the 18th century
Francesco Cetti (1726–1778) – Jesuit zoologist and mathematician
Tommaso Ceva (1648–1737) – Jesuit mathematician, poet, and professor who wrote treatises on geometry, gravity, and arithmetic
Christopher Clavius (1538–1612) – German mathematician and astronomer, most noted in connection with the Gregorian calendar, his arithmetic books were used by many mathematicians including Leibniz and Descartes
Gaston-Laurent Coeurdoux (1691–1779) – Jesuit ethnologist and philologer who composed the first treatise of Indology.
Guy Consolmagno (1952–) – Jesuit astronomer and planetary scientist, serving as Director of the Vatican Observatory
Nicolaus Copernicus (1473–1543) – Renaissance astronomer and canon famous for his heliocentric cosmology that set in motion the Copernican Revolution
Vincenzo Coronelli (1650–1718) – Franciscan cosmographer, cartographer, encyclopedist, and globe-maker
Bonaventura Corti (1729–1813) – Italian biologist and physicist who made microscopic observations on Tremels, rotifers and seaweeds
George Coyne (1933–2020) – Jesuit astronomer and former director of the Vatican Observatory whose research interests have been in polarimetric studies of various subjects, including Seyfert galaxies
James Cullen (mathematician) (1867–1933) – Jesuit mathematician who published what is now known as Cullen numbers in number theory
James Curley (astronomer) (1796–1889) – Jesuit, first director of Georgetown Observatory and determined the latitude and longitude of Washington, D.C.
Albert Curtz (1600–1671) – Jesuit astronomer who expanded on the works of Tycho Brahe and contributed to early understanding of the moon; the crater Curtius on the Moon is named after him
Johann Baptist Cysat (1587–1657) – Jesuit mathematician and astronomer, after whom the lunar crater Cysatus is named; published the first printed European book concerning Japan; one of the first to make use of the newly developed telescope; did important research on comets and the Orion nebula
Jean-Baptiste Chappe d'Auteroche (1722–1769) – priest and astronomer best known for his observations of the transits of Venus

D
Ignazio Danti (1536–1586) – Dominican mathematician, astronomer, cosmographer, and cartographer
Armand David (1826–1900) – Lazarist priest, zoologist, and botanist who did important work in these fields in China
Francesco Denza (1834–1894) – Barnabite meteorologist, astronomer, and director of Vatican Observatory
Václav Prokop Diviš (1698–1765) – Czech priest who studied electrical phenomenons and constructed, among other inventions, the first electrified musical instrument in history
Johann Dzierzon (1811–1906) – priest and pioneering apiarist who discovered the phenomenon of parthenogenesis among bees, and designed the first successful movable-frame beehive; has been described as the "father of modern apiculture"

F
Francesco Faà di Bruno (c. 1825–1888) – priest and mathematician beatified by Pope John Paul II
Honoré Fabri (1607–1688) – Jesuit mathematician and physicist
Jean-Charles de la Faille (1597–1652) – Jesuit mathematician who determined the center of gravity of the sector of a circle for the first time
Gabriele Falloppio (1523–1562) – canon and one of the most important anatomists and physicians of the sixteenth century; the Fallopian tubes, which extend from the uterus to the ovaries, are named for him
Gyula Fényi (1845–1927) – Jesuit astronomer and director of the Haynald Observatory; noted for his observations of the sun; the crater Fényi on the Moon is named after him
Louis Feuillée (1660–1732) – Minim explorer, astronomer, geographer, and botanist
Kevin T. FitzGerald (1955–) – American molecular biologist and holds the Dr. David Lauler chair in Catholic Health Care Ethics at Georgetown University
Placidus Fixlmillner (1721–1791) – Benedictine priest and one of the first astronomers to compute the orbit of Uranus
Paolo Frisi (1728–1784) – priest, mathematician, and astronomer who did significant work in hydraulics
José Gabriel Funes (1963–) – Jesuit astronomer and former director of the Vatican Observatory
 (1787–1837) – priest and physicist born in Vieste and working in Naples

G
Joseph Galien (1699 – c. 1762) – Dominican professor who wrote on aeronautics, hailstorms, and airships
Jean Gallois (1632–1707) – French scholar, abbot, and member of Académie des Sciences
Leonardo Garzoni (1543–1592) – Jesuit natural philosopher; author of the first known example of a modern treatment of magnetic phenomena
Pierre Gassendi (1592–1655) – French priest, astronomer, and mathematician who published the first data on the transit of Mercury; best known intellectual project attempted to reconcile Epicurean atomism with Christianity
Antoine Gaubil (1689–1759) – French astronomer who was the director general of the College of Interpreters at the court of China between 1741 and 1759 and centralized information provided by the Jesuit observatories throughout the world
Agostino Gemelli (1878–1959) – Franciscan physician and psychologist; founded Catholic University of the Sacred Heart in Milan
Niccolò Gianpriamo (1686–1759) – Italian Jesuit, missionary and astronomer
Giuseppe Maria Giovene (1753–1837) – Italian archpriest, naturalist,  meteorologist, agronomist and entomologist
Johannes von Gmunden (c. 1380 – 1442) – canon, mathematician, and astronomer who compiled astronomical tables; Asteroid 15955 Johannesgmunden named in his honor
Carlos de Sigüenza y Góngora (1645–1700) – priest, polymath, mathematician, astronomer, and cartographer; drew the first map of all of New Spain
Gilles-François de Gottignies (1630–1689) – Belgian Jesuit mathematician and astronomer.
Andrew Gordon (1712–1751) – Benedictine monk, priest, physicist, and inventor who made the first electric motor
Giovanni Antonio Grassi (1775–1849) – Jesuit astronomer who calculated the longitude of Washington, D.C.
Orazio Grassi (1583–1654) – Jesuit mathematician, astronomer and architect; engaged in controversy with Galileo on the subject of comets
Christoph Grienberger (1561–1636) – Jesuit astronomer after whom the crater Gruemberger on the Moon is named; verified Galileo's discovery of Jupiter's moons.
Francesco Maria Grimaldi (1618–1663) – Jesuit who discovered the diffraction of light (indeed coined the term "diffraction"), investigated the free fall of objects, and built and used instruments to measure geological features on the moon
Robert Grosseteste (c. 1175 – 1253) – bishop who was one of the most knowledgeable men of the Middle Ages; has been called "the first man ever to write down a complete set of steps for performing a scientific experiment"
Johann Grueber (1623–1680) – Jesuit missionary and astronomer in China
Paul Guldin (1577–1643) – Jesuit mathematician and astronomer who discovered the Guldinus theorem to determine the surface and the volume of a solid of revolution
Bartolomeu de Gusmão (1685–1724) – Jesuit known for his early work on lighter-than-air airship design

H
Johann Georg Hagen (1847–1930) – Jesuit director of the Georgetown and Vatican Observatories; the crater Hagen on the Moon is named after him
Frank Haig (1928–) – American physics professor
Nicholas Halma (1755–1828) – French abbot, mathematician, and translator
Jean-Baptiste du Hamel (1624–1706) – French priest, natural philosopher, and secretary of the Academie Royale des Sciences
René Just Haüy (1743–1822) – priest known as the father of crystallography
Maximilian Hell (1720–1792) – Jesuit astronomer and director of the Vienna Observatory who wrote astronomy tables and observed the Transit of Venus; the crater Hell on the Moon is named after him
Michał Heller (1936–) – Polish priest, Templeton Prize winner, and prolific writer on numerous scientific topics
Lorenz Hengler (1806–1858) – priest often credited as the inventor of the horizontal pendulum
Hermann of Reichenau (1013–1054) – Benedictine historian, music theorist, astronomer, and mathematician
Lorenzo Hervás y Panduro (1735–1809) – Jesuit philologer and discoverer of the Austronesian language family.
Pierre Marie Heude (1836–1902) – Jesuit missionary and zoologist who studied the natural history of Eastern Asia
Franz von Paula Hladnik (1773–1844) – priest and botanist who discovered several new kinds of plants, and certain genera have been named after him
Giovanni Battista Hodierna (1597–1660) – priest and astronomer who catalogued nebulous objects and developed an early microscope
Johann Baptiste Horvath (1732–1799) – Hungarian physicist who taught physics and philosophy at the University of Tyrnau, later of Buda, and wrote many Newtonian textbooks
Victor-Alphonse Huard (1853–1929) – priest, naturalist, educator, writer, and promoter of the natural sciences

I
Maximus von Imhof (1758–1817) – German Augustinian physicist and director of the Munich Academy of Sciences
Giovanni Inghirami (1779–1851) – Italian Piarist astronomer who has a valley on the moon named after him as well as a crater

J
 Frans Alfons Janssens (1865–1924) – Catholic priest and the discoverer of crossing-over of genes during meiosis, which he called 'chiasmatypie'
François Jacquier (1711–1788) – Franciscan mathematician and physicist; at his death he was connected with nearly all the great scientific and literary societies of Europe
Stanley Jaki (1924–2009) – Benedictine priest and prolific writer who wrote on the relationship between science and theology
Ányos Jedlik (1800–1895) – Benedictine engineer, physicist, and inventor; considered by Hungarians and Slovaks to be the unsung father of the dynamo and electric motor

K
Georg Joseph Kamel (1661–1706) – Jesuit missionary and botanist who established the first pharmacy in the Philippines; the genus Camellia is named for him
Eusebio Kino (1645–1711) – Jesuit missionary, mathematician, astronomer and cartographer; drew maps based on his explorations first showing that California was not an island, as then believed; published an astronomical treatise in Mexico City of his observations of the Kirsch comet
Otto Kippes (1905–1994) – priest acknowledged for his work in asteroid orbit calculations; the main belt asteroid 1780 Kippes was named in his honour
Athanasius Kircher (1602–1680) – Jesuit who has been called the father of Egyptology and "Master of a hundred arts"; wrote an encyclopedia of China; one of the first people to observe microbes through a microscope; in his Scrutinium Pestis of 1658 he noted the presence of "little worms" or "animalcules" in the blood, and concluded that the disease was caused by micro-organisms; this is antecedent to germ theory
Wenceslas Pantaleon Kirwitzer (1588–1626) – Jesuit astronomer and missionary to China who published observations of comets
Jan Krzysztof Kluk (1739–1796) – priest, naturalist agronomist, and entomologist who wrote a multi-volume work on Polish animal life
Marian Wolfgang Koller (1792–1866) – Benedictine professor who wrote on astronomy, physics, and meteorology
Franz Xaver Kugler (1862–1929) – Jesuit chemist, mathematician, and Assyriologist who is most noted for his studies of cuneiform tablets and Babylonian astronomy

L
Ramon Llull (c. 1232 – c. 1315) – Majorcan writer and philosopher, logician and a Franciscan tertiary considered a pioneer of computation theory
Nicolas Louis de Lacaille (1713–1762) – French deacon and astronomer noted for cataloguing stars, nebulous objects, and constellations
Joseph-Clovis-Kemner Laflamme (1849–1910) – chair of mineralogy and geology at Université Laval, president of the Royal Society of Canada from 1891 to 1892, and chevalier of the Légion d'honneur
Eugene Lafont (1837–1908) – Jesuit physicist, astronomer, and founder of the first Scientific Society in India
Antoine de Laloubère (1600–1664) – Jesuit and first mathematician to study the properties of the helix
Bernard Lamy (1640–1715) – Oratorian philosopher and mathematician who wrote on the parallelogram of forces
Dámaso Antonio Larrañaga (1771–1848) – Uruguayan priest, naturalist and botanist who made important contributions to these scientific disciplines. He was a decisive influence behind the foundation of the National Library of Uruguay and the National University of Uruguay. His face appears on the 2000 Uruguayan peso banknotes.
Pierre André Latreille (1762–1833) – priest and entomologist whose works describing insects assigned many of the insect taxa still in use today
Georges Lemaître (1894–1966) – Belgian priest and father of the Big Bang theory
Émile Licent (1876–1952) – French Jesuit trained as a natural historian; spent more than 25 years researching in Tianjin, China
Joseph Liesganig (1719–1799) – Austrian astronomer and geodesist who managed the Jesuit observatory in Vienna between 1756 and 1773
Thomas Linacre (c. 1460 – 1524) – English priest, humanist, translator, and physician
Francis Line (1595–1675) – Jesuit magnetic clock and sundial maker who disagreed with some of the findings of Newton and Boyle
Juan Caramuel y Lobkowitz (1606–1682) – Cistercian who wrote on a variety of scientific subjects, including probability theory
João de Loureiro (1717–1791) – Portuguese mathematician and botanist active in Cochinchina

M
Jean Mabillon (1632–1707) – Benedictine monk and scholar, considered the founder of palaeography and diplomatics
James B. Macelwane (1883–1956) – Jesuit seismologist who contributed a volume to the first textbook on seismology in America
John MacEnery (1797–1841) – archaeologist who investigated the Palaeolithic remains at Kents Cavern
Manuel Magri (1851–1907) – Jesuit ethnographer, archaeologist and writer; one of Malta's pioneers in archaeology
Emmanuel Maignan (1601–1676) – Minim physicist and professor of medicine who published works on gnomonics and perspective
Christopher Maire (1697–1767) – Jesuit astronomer and mathematician who collaborated with Roger Boscovich on calculations of the arc of the meridian
 (1724–1793) – Hungarian mathematician and physicist who taught mathematics, experimental physics and mechanics at the Vienna Theresianum and had a part in the preparation of the Ratio educationis (1777), which reformed the imperial teaching system in the spirit of Enlightenment
Charles Malapert (1581–1630) – Jesuit writer, astronomer, and proponent of Aristotelian cosmology; also known for observations of sunpots, the lunar surface, and the southern sky; the crater Malapert on the Moon is named after him
Nicolas Malebranche (1638–1715) – Oratorian philosopher who studied physics, optics, and the laws of motion and disseminated the ideas of Descartes and Leibniz
Marcin of Urzędów (c. 1500 – 1573) – priest, physician, pharmacist, and botanist
Joseph Maréchal (1878–1944) – Jesuit philosopher and psychologist
Edme Mariotte (c. 1620 – 1684) – priest and physicist who recognized Boyle's Law and wrote about the nature of color
Francesco Maurolico (1494–1575) – Benedictine who made contributions to the fields of geometry, optics, conics, mechanics, music, and astronomy, and gave the first known proof by mathematical induction
Christian Mayer (astronomer) (1719–1783) – Jesuit astronomer most noted for pioneering the study of binary stars
James Robert McConnell (1915–1999) – Irish theoretical physicist, pontifical academician, Monsignor
Michael C. McFarland (1948–) – American computer scientist and president of the College of the Holy Cross in Worcester, Massachusetts
Paul McNally (1890–1955) – Jesuit astronomer and director of Georgetown Observatory; the crater McNally on the Moon is named after him
William W. Meissner (1931–2010) – Jesuit psychiatrist and psychoanalytic theorist, recipient of the Oskar Pfister Award and William C. Bier Award
Gregor Mendel (1822–1884) – Augustinian monk and father of genetics
Pietro Mengoli (1626–1686) – priest and mathematician who first posed the famous Basel Problem
Giuseppe Mercalli (1850–1914) – priest, volcanologist, and director of the Vesuvius Observatory who is best remembered today for his Mercalli scale for measuring earthquakes which is still in use
Marin Mersenne (1588–1648) – Minim philosopher, mathematician, and music theorist, so-called "father of acoustics"
Paul of Middelburg (1446–1534) – Bishop who wrote on the reform of the calendar
Maciej Miechowita (1457–1523) – canon who wrote the first accurate geographical and ethnographical description of Eastern Europe, as well as two medical treatises
François-Napoléon-Marie Moigno (1804–1884) – Jesuit physicist and mathematician; was an expositor of science and translator rather than an original investigator
Juan Ignacio Molina (1740–1829) – Jesuit naturalist, historian, botanist, ornithologist and geographer
Gerald Molloy (1834–1906) – Irish priest, professor of natural philosophy at (and later Rector of) the Catholic University of Ireland, and expert on electricity
Louis Moréri (1643–1680) – 17th-century priest and encyclopaedist
Theodorus Moretus (1602–1667) – Jesuit mathematician and author of the first mathematical dissertations ever defended in Prague; the lunar crater Moretus is named after him
Roberto Landell de Moura (1861–1928) – Brazilian Jesuit, developing long-distance audio transmissions, using a variety of technologies, including an improved megaphone device. photophone (using light beams) and radio signals.
Gabriel Mouton (1618–1694) – abbot, mathematician, astronomer, and early proponent of the metric system
Jozef Murgaš (1864–1929) – priest who contributed to wireless telegraphy and helped develop mobile communications and wireless transmission of information and human voice
José Celestino Mutis (1732–1808) – canon, botanist, and mathematician who led the Royal Botanical Expedition of the New World

N
Bienvenido Nebres (1940–) – Filipino mathematician, president of Ateneo de Manila University, and an honoree of the National Scientist of the Philippines award
John Needham (1713–1781) – English biologist and Catholic priest
Antonio Neri (1576–1614) – Italian priest who wrote the first major treatise on the science of glassmaking 
Jean François Niceron (1613–1646) – Minim mathematician who studied geometrical optics
Nicholas of Cusa (1401–1464) – cardinal, philosopher, jurist, mathematician, astronomer, and one of the great geniuses and polymaths of the 15th century
Julius Nieuwland (1878–1936) – Holy Cross priest, known for his contributions to acetylene research and its use as the basis for one type of synthetic rubber, which eventually led to the invention of neoprene by DuPont
Jean-Antoine Nollet (1700–1770) – abbot and physicist who discovered the phenomenon of osmosis in natural membranes

O
Hugo Obermaier (1877–1946) – priest, prehistorian, and anthropologist who is known for his work on the diffusion of mankind in Europe during the Ice Age, as well as his work with north Spanish cave art
William of Ockham (c. 1288 – c. 1348) – Franciscan Scholastic who wrote significant works on logic, physics, and theology; known for Occam's razor-principle
Nicole Oresme (c. 1323 – 1382) – one of the most famous and influential philosophers of the later Middle Ages; economist, mathematician, physicist, astronomer, philosopher, theologian and Bishop of Lisieux, and competent translator; one of the most original thinkers of the 14th century
Barnaba Oriani (1752–1832) – Barnabite geodesist, astronomer and scientist whose greatest achievement was his detailed research of the planet Uranus; also known for Oriani's theorem

P
Tadeusz Pacholczyk (1965–) – priest, neuroscientist and writer
Luca Pacioli (c. 1446–1517) – Franciscan friar who published several works on mathematics; often regarded as the "father of accounting"
Ignace-Gaston Pardies (1636–1673) – Jesuit physicist known for his correspondence with Newton and Descartes
Franciscus Patricius (1529–1597) – priest, cosmic theorist, philosopher, and Renaissance scholar
John Peckham (1230–1292) – Archbishop of Canterbury and early practitioner of experimental science
Nicolas Claude Fabri de Peiresc (1580–1637) – abbot and astronomer who discovered the Orion Nebula; lunar crater Peirescius named in his honor
Stephen Joseph Perry (1833–1889) – Jesuit astronomer and Fellow of the Royal Society; made frequent observations of Jupiter's satellites, of stellar occultations, of comets, of meteorites, of sun spots, and faculae
Giambattista Pianciani (1784–1862) – Jesuit mathematician and physicist who established the electric nature of aurora borealis
Giuseppe Piazzi (1746–1826) – Theatine mathematician and astronomer who discovered Ceres, today known as the largest member of the asteroid belt; also did important work cataloguing stars
Jean Picard (1620–1682) – priest and first person to measure the size of the Earth to a reasonable degree of accuracy; also developed what became the standard method for measuring the right ascension of a celestial object; the PICARD mission, an orbiting solar observatory, is named in his honor
Edward Pigot (1858–1929) – Jesuit seismologist and astronomer
Alexandre Guy Pingré (1711–1796) – French priest astronomer and naval geographer; the crater Pingré on the Moon is named after him, as is the asteroid 12719 Pingré
Andrew Pinsent (1966–) – priest whose current research includes the application of insights from autism and social cognition to 'second-person' accounts of moral perception and character formation; his previous scientific research contributed to the DELPHI experiment at CERN
Jean Baptiste François Pitra (1812–1889) – Benedictine cardinal, archaeologist and theologian who noteworthy for his great archaeological discoveries
Charles Plumier (1646–1704) – Minim friar who is considered one of the most important botanical explorers of his time
Marcin Odlanicki Poczobutt (1728–1810) – Jesuit astronomer and mathematician; granted the title of the King's Astronomer; the crater Poczobutt on the Moon is named after him; taught astronomy at Vilna University (1764–1808), managed its observatory and was the rector of Vilna University between 1777 and 1808
Léon Abel Provancher (1820–1892) – priest and naturalist devoted to the study and description of the fauna and flora of Canada; his pioneer work won for him the appellation of the "father of natural history in Canada"

R
Claude Rabuel (1669–1729) – Jesuit mathematician who analyzed Descartes's Géométrie
Louis Receveur (1757–1788) – Franciscan naturalist and astronomer; described as being as close as one could get to being an ecologist in the 18th century
Franz Reinzer (1661–1708) – Jesuit who wrote an in-depth meteorological, astrological, and political compendium covering topics such as comets, meteors, lightning, winds, fossils, metals, bodies of water, and subterranean treasures and secrets of the earth
Louis Rendu (1789–1859) – bishop who wrote an important book on the mechanisms of glacial motion; the Rendu Glacier, Alaska, US and Mount Rendu, Antarctica are named for him
Vincenzo Riccati (1707–1775) – Italian Jesuit mathematician and physicist
Matteo Ricci (1552–1610) – one of the founding fathers of the Jesuit China Mission and co-author of the first European-Chinese dictionary
Giovanni Battista Riccioli (1598–1671) – Jesuit astronomer who authored Almagestum novum, an influential encyclopedia of astronomy; the first person to measure the rate of acceleration of a freely falling body; created a selenograph with Father Grimaldi that now adorns the entrance at the National Air and Space Museum in Washington, D.C.; first to note that Mizar was a "double star"
Richard of Wallingford (1292–1336) – abbot, renowned clockmaker, and one of the initiators of western trigonometry
 (1881–1939) – Spanish astronomer and director of Observatorio del Ebro, wrote El Firmamento
Johannes Ruysch (c. 1460 – 1533) – priest, explorer, cartographer, and astronomer who created the second oldest known printed representation of the New World

S
Giovanni Girolamo Saccheri (1667–1733) – Jesuit mathematician and geometer who was perhaps the first European to write about Non-Euclidean geometry
Johannes de Sacrobosco (c. 1195 – c. 1256) – Irish monk and astronomer who wrote the authoritative medieval astronomy text Tractatus de Sphaera; his Algorismus was the first text to introduce Hindu-Arabic numerals and procedures into the European university curriculum; the lunar crater Sacrobosco is named after him
Gregoire de Saint-Vincent (1584–1667) – Jesuit mathematician who made important contributions to the study of the hyperbola
Alphonse Antonio de Sarasa (1618–1667) – Jesuit mathematician who contributed to the understanding of logarithms
Christoph Scheiner (c. 1573 – 1650) – Jesuit physicist, astronomer, and inventor of the pantograph; wrote on a wide range of scientific subjects, including sunspots, leading to a dispute with Galileo Galilei
Wilhelm Schmidt (linguist) (1868–1954) – Austrian priest and missionary of The Society of the Divine Word; linguist, anthropologist, and ethnologist
Hermann Schmitz (entomologist) (1878–1960) – German Jesuit and entomologist who specialised in Hymenoptera and Diptera.
George Schoener (1864–1941) – priest who became known in the United States as the "Padre of the Roses" for his experiments in rose breeding
Gaspar Schott (1608–1666) – Jesuit physicist, astronomer, and natural philosopher who is most widely known for his works on hydraulic and mechanical instruments
Franz Paula von Schrank (1747–1835) – priest, botanist, entomologist, and prolific writer
Berthold Schwarz (c. 14th century) – Franciscan friar and reputed inventor of gunpowder and firearms
Anton Maria Schyrleus of Rheita (1604–1660) – Capuchin astronomer and optician who built Kepler's telescope
George Mary Searle (1839–1918) – Paulist astronomer and professor who discovered six galaxies
Angelo Secchi (1818–1878) – Jesuit pioneer in astronomical spectroscopy and one of the first scientists to state authoritatively that the sun is a star; discovered the existence of solar spicules and drew an early map of Mars
Alessandro Serpieri (1823–1885) – priest, astronomer, and seismologist who studied shooting stars, and was the first to introduce the concept of the seismic radiant
Serafino Serrati (18th century) – Benedictine monk, attributed the invention of a steamboat, also made observations about aerostatic globes
Gerolamo Sersale (1584–1654) – Jesuit astronomer and selenographer; his map of the moon can be seen in the Naval Observatory of San Fernando; the lunar crater Sirsalis is named after him
Benedict Sestini (1816–1890) – Jesuit astronomer, mathematician and architect; studied sunspots and eclipses; wrote textbooks on a variety of mathematical subjects
Mihalj Šilobod Bolšić (1724–1787) – Roman Catholic priest, mathematician, writer, and musical theorist primarily known for writing the first Croatian arithmetic textbook Arithmatika Horvatzka (published in Zagreb, 1758)
René François Walter de Sluse (1622–1685) – canon and mathematician with a family of curves named after him
Domingo de Soto (1494–1560) – Spanish Dominican priest and professor at the University of Salamanca; in his commentaries to Aristotle he proposed that free-falling bodies undergo constant acceleration
Lazzaro Spallanzani (1729–1799) – priest, biologist, and physiologist who made important contributions to the experimental study of bodily functions, animal reproduction, and essentially discovered echolocation; his research of biogenesis paved the way for the investigations of Louis Pasteur
Valentin Stansel (1621–1705) – Jesuit astronomer in Brazil, who discovered a comet, which, after accurate positions were made via F. de Gottignies in Goa, became known as the Estancel-Gottignies comet
Johan Stein (1871–1951) – Jesuit astronomer and director of the Vatican Observatory, which he modernized and relocated to Castel Gandolfo; the crater Stein on the far side of the Moon is named after him
Nicolas Steno (1638–1686) – bishop beatified by Pope John Paul II who is often called the father of geology and stratigraphy, and is known for Steno's principles
Joseph Stepling (1716–1778) – Bohemian astronomer, physicist and mathematician who managed the Jesuit observatory in Prague between 1751 and 1778
Antonio Stoppani (1824–1891) – Italian priest, geologist, and palaeontologist
Pope Sylvester II (c. 946 – 1003) – prolific scholar who endorsed and promoted Arabic knowledge of arithmetic, mathematics, and astronomy in Europe, reintroducing the abacus and armillary sphere which had been lost to Europe since the end of the Greco-Roman era
Alexius Sylvius Polonus (1593 – c. 1653) – Jesuit astronomer who studied sunspots and published a work on calendariography
Ignacije Szentmartony (1718–1793) – Croatian Jesuit cartographer and royal mathematician and astronomer, who became a member of the expedition that worked on the rearrangement of the frontiers among colonies in South America, especially Brazil

T
André Tacquet (1612–1660) – Jesuit mathematician whose work laid the groundwork for the eventual discovery of calculus
Pierre Teilhard de Chardin (1881–1955) – Jesuit paleontologist and geologist who took part in the discovery of Peking Man
Francesco Lana de Terzi (c. 1631 – 1687) – Jesuit referred to as the Father of Aviation for his pioneering efforts; he also developed a blind writing alphabet prior to Braille.
Theodoric of Freiberg (c. 1250 – c. 1310) – Dominican theologian and physicist who gave the first correct geometrical analysis of the rainbow
Joseph Tiefenthaler (1710–1785) – Jesuit who was one of the earliest European geographers to write about India
Giuseppe Toaldo (1719–1797) – priest and physicist who studied atmospheric electricity and did important work with lightning rods; the asteroid 23685 Toaldo is named for him
José Torrubia (c. 1700 – 1768) – Franciscan linguist, scientist, collector of fossils and books, and writer on historical, political and religious subjects
Franz de Paula Triesnecker (1745–1817) – Jesuit astronomer and director of the Vienna Observatory; published a number of treatises on astronomy and geography; the crater Triesnecker on the Moon is named after him

V
Basil Valentine – priest chemistry
Luca Valerio (1552–1618) – Jesuit mathematician who developed ways to find volumes and centers of gravity of solid bodies
Pierre Varignon (1654–1722) – priest and mathematician whose principle contributions were to statics and mechanics; created a mechanical explanation of gravitation
Jacques de Vaucanson (1709–1782) – French Minim friar inventor and artist who was responsible for the creation of impressive and innovative automata and machines such as the first completely automated loom
Giovanni Battista Venturi (1746–1822) – priest who discovered the Venturi effect
Fausto Veranzio (c. 1551 – 1617) – bishop, polymath, inventor, and lexicographer
Ferdinand Verbiest (1623–1688) – Jesuit astronomer and mathematician; designed what some claim to be the first ever self-propelled vehicle, which many claim this as the world's first automobile
Francesco de Vico (1805–1848) – Jesuit astronomer who discovered or co-discovered a number of comets; also made observations of Saturn and the gaps in its rings; the lunar crater De Vico and the asteroid 20103 de Vico are named after him
Vincent of Beauvais (c. 1190 – c. 1264) – Dominican who wrote the most influential encyclopedia of the Middle Ages
Benito Vines (1837–1893) – Jesuit meteorologist known as "Father Hurricane" who made the first weather model to predict the trajectory of a hurricane
Vitello (1230–1280/1314)
János Vitéz (archbishop) (c. 1405 – 1472) – Cardinal Archbishop of Esztergom, astronomer, and mathematician
 Giovanni Serafino Volta (1764–1842) – priest and paleontologist who wrote the first treatise on fossil ichthyology in Italy

W
Martin Waldseemüller (c. 1470 – 1520) – German priest and cartographer who, along with Matthias Ringmann, is credited with the first recorded usage of the word America
Erich Wasmann (1859–1931) – Austrian entomologist known for Wasmannian mimicry
Godefroy Wendelin (1580–1667) – priest and astronomer who recognized that Kepler's third law applied to the satellites of Jupiter; the lunar crater Vendelinus is named in his honor
Johannes Werner (1468–1522) – priest, mathematician, astronomer, and geographer
Witelo (c. 1230 – after 1280, before 1314) – friar, physicist, natural philosopher, and mathematician; lunar crater Vitello named in his honor; his Perspectiva powerfully influenced later scientists, in particular Johannes Kepler
Julian Tenison Woods (1832–1889) – Passionist geologist and mineralogist
Theodor Wulf (1868–1946) – Jesuit physicist who was one of the first experimenters to detect excess atmospheric radiation
Franz Xaver von Wulfen (1728–1805) – Jesuit botanist, mineralogist, and alpinist

X
Leonardo Ximenes (1711–1786) – Italian physicist and astronomer, specialist of hydraulics, creator and director of the Observatory San Giovanino in Florence

Z
John Zahm (1851–1921) – Holy Cross priest and South American explorer
Giuseppe Zamboni (1776–1846) – priest and physicist who invented the Zamboni pile, an early electric battery similar to the Voltaic pile
Francesco Zantedeschi (1797–1873) – priest who was among the first to recognize the marked absorption by the atmosphere of red, yellow, and green light; published papers on the production of electric currents in closed circuits by the approach and withdrawal of a magnet, thereby anticipating Michael Faraday's classical experiments of 1831
Thomas Żebrowski (1714–1758) – Jesuit architect, mathematician, and astronomer; instrumental in establishing and funding the Observatory of Vilnius University.
Casimir Zeglen (1869–after 1927) – Polish American priest, invented a type of silk bulletproof vest
Niccolò Zucchi (1586–1670) – claimed to have tried to build a reflecting telescope in 1616 but abandoned the idea (maybe due to the poor quality of the mirror); may have been the first to see the belts on the planet Jupiter (1630)
Godefroy Zumoffen (1848–1928) – French Jesuit archaeologist and geologist notable for his work on prehistory in Lebanon
Giovanni Battista Zupi (c. 1590 – 1650) – Jesuit astronomer, mathematician, and first person to discover that the planet Mercury had orbital phases; the crater Zupus on the Moon is named after him

See also

Notes

References

Bibliography

Further reading

Barr, Stephen M. Modern Physics and Ancient Faith. Notre Dame, IN: University of Notre Dame, 2006.
Broad, William J. "How the Church aided 'Heretical' Astronomy," New York Times, October 19, 1999.
Feingold, Mordechai, ed. Jesuit Science and the Republic of Letters. Cambridge: MIT Press, 2002.
Gilson, Etienne, Reason and Revelation in the Middle Ages. New York: Charles Scribner's Sons, 1970.
Grant, Edward. The Foundations of Modern Science in the Middle Ages: Their Religious, Institutional, and Intellectual Contexts. Cambridge: Cambridge University Press, 1996.
Grant, Edward. God and Reason in the Middle Ages. Cambridge: Cambridge University Press, 2001.
Hannam, James. The Genesis of Science: How the Christian Middle Ages Launched the Scientific Revolution. Washington, DC: Regnery, 2011.
Horn, Stephan Otto, ed. Creation and Evolution: A Conference with Pope Benedict XVI in Castel Gandolfo. San Francisco, CA: Ignatius, 2008.
Jaki, Stanley. The Savior of Science. Grand Rapids: Eerdmans, 2000.
Jaki, Stanley. Science and Creation: From Eternal Cycles to an Oscillating University. Edinburgh: Scottish Academic Press, 1986.
Lindberg, David C. The Beginnings of Western Science. Chicago: University of Chicago Press, 1992.
MacDonnell, Joseph E. Jesuit Geometers. St. Louis: Institute of Jesuit Sources, 1989.
Schönborn, Christoph Cardinal. Chance or Purpose?: Creation, Evolution, and a Rational Faith. San Francisco: Ignatius, 2007.
Spitzer, Robert J. New Proofs for the Existence of God: Contributions of Contemporary Physics and Philosophy. Grand Rapids: Wm. B. Eerdmans Publishing Company, 2010.
Walsh, James J. The Popes and Science. New York: Fordham University Press, 1911.

 
Cleric-scientists
Catholic cleric-scientists
Catholic Church and science